Rutter is an English surname of Old French origin, introduced into England after the Norman Conquest of 1066.

Origins and variants 
The family name Rutter appeared on the early census rolls taken by the Kings of Britain, shortly after the Norman Invasion.
 
One theory suggests that the surname is French in origin and related to the Old French words roteor, roteeur, routeeur, which are related to playing the rote, an early medieval stringed instrument.

Another theory suggests the surname may be related to the Old French words rotier, routier, meaning robber, highwayman,  footpad.

People with the surname 
 Adam Rutter (born 1986), Australian racewalker
 Barrie Rutter (born 1946), English actor and theatre director
 Brad Rutter  (born 1978), American quiz show host
 Claire Rutter (born 1976), English operatic soprano
 Claude Rutter (born 1928), English retired Anglican priest and former cricketer
 Dale Rutter (born 1972), birth name of American pornographic actor Dale DaBone
 Deborah Rutter, American arts executive 
 Eileen Joyce (Joy) Rutter (born 1945), English fantasy writer known by pen name Joy Chant 
 Frank Rutter (1876–1937), British art critic, curator and activist
 Georginio Rutter (born 2002), French footballer
 Jane Rutter (born 1958), Australian flautist
 John Rutter (born 1945), English composer and conductor 
 Keith Rutter (born 1934), English footballer
 Lou Rutter (1914–1971), American professional basketball player
 Sir Michael Rutter (1933–2021), first English professor of child psychiatry 
 Michael Rutter (born 1973), British motorcycle racer
 Owen Rutter (1889–1944), British author 
 Peta Rutter (born 1959), New Zealand actress
 Sally Perkins Rutter (1913–1983), birth name of American actress Gale Page
 Samuel Rutter (17th century), Bishop of Sodor and Man
 Steve Rutter (born 1960), English footballer and manager
 Tommy Rutter (born 1977), English footballer
 Tony Rutter (1941–2020), British motorcycle racer
 Troy Rutter (born 1973), American actor
 William Rutter (MP) (by 1488–1541), English politician
 William J. Rutter (born 1926), American biochemist, co-founder of biotechnology firm Chiron Corporation

Fictional characters 
 Anita Rutter in Anita and Me, 1996 novel and Anita and Me, 2002 film 
 Dr Rutter in Incompetence, 2003 novel

References

English-language surnames
Occupational surnames